Híradó (or often M1 Híradó for clarity, means News Station or M1 News) is the main news program of MTVA, the Hungarian public broadcaster. It was broadcast daily on M1 at 19:30 before 15 March 2015. Since then M1 became a news channel, and Híradó is up-to-date every hour, with its main edition at 19:30 expanded to 60 minutes. The broadcasts are simulcasted on Duna and Duna World. The Híradó has a countdown before opening.

Process

External links 

 www.hirado.hu – Híradó's official website  

Hungarian television shows
Television news shows
1957 Hungarian television series debuts
1950s Hungarian television series
1960s Hungarian television series
1970s Hungarian television series
1980s Hungarian television series
1990s Hungarian television series
2000s Hungarian television series
2010s Hungarian television series
Magyar Televízió original programming